This is a list of International XI women One Day International (ODI) cricketers. Overall, 27 players played in at least one Women's One Day International for International XI. An ODI is an international cricket match between two teams, each having ODI status, as determined by the International Cricket Council.

International XI featured at the 1973 and 1982 Women's Cricket World Cups, including the best players from around the world that were not already appearing for their country in the tournament. Only one player, Sue Rattray, appeared in both tournaments for the team.

Key

General
  – Captain
  – Wicket-keeper
 First – Year of debut
 Last – Year of latest game
Mat: number of matches played
 Win% – Winning percentage
Batting
Runs: number of runs scored by batsman/off bowler's bowling
HS: highest score
Avg: batting average
*: an innings that ended not out

Bowling
Balls: number of balls bowled
Wkt: number of wickets taken
BBI: best bowling figures
Avg: bowling average
Fielding
Ca: number of catches taken
St: number of stumpings made

Players
Players listed below may have also played One Day International cricket for their respective national teams; only their record for International XI is shown. This list is arranged in the order in which each player won her first ODI cap.

Captains

References

International XI